Kampong Bakiau (also Kampong Bekiau) is a village in the north-east of Tutong District, Brunei, about  from the district town Pekan Tutong. It is one of the villages within Mukim Kiudang.

Administration 
Kampong Bakiau and the neighbouring village Kampong Pengkalan Mau shares a village head and Village Consultative Council.

School 

Notes

References 

Bakiau